The discography of Lone Star, a Welsh hard rock band, consists of three studio albums, three live albums, one compilation album, one promotional extended play and three singles. The band split up in 1978. In 2000, a third Lone Star album was released Riding High — The Unreleased Third Album by Paul Chapman on Zoom Club. It was released without the participation of the other former band members and consisted of demos recorded by Chapman, plus previously unreleased Lone Star material, prior to the them splitting up.

Albums

Studio albums

Live albums

Compilation albums

Extended plays

Singles

References

External links

Rock music group discographies
Discographies of British artists